Miyankuh-e Gharbi Rural District is a rural district (dehestan) in the Central District of Pol-e Dokhtar County, Lorestan Province, Iran. At the 2006 census, its population was 2,990, in 616 families.  The rural district has 55 villages.

References 

Rural Districts of Lorestan Province
Pol-e Dokhtar County